NILP may refer to one of the following:
National Institute for Latino Policy, USA
Northern Ireland Labour Party
Labour Party of Northern Ireland